Delta is an unincorporated community in Wayne County, Kentucky, United States.

A post office was established in 1906 and named for the first postmaster's daughter-in-law, Delta Casada Hammond.

References

Unincorporated communities in Wayne County, Kentucky
Unincorporated communities in Kentucky